The Yorkshire Society is a non-political organisation founded in December 1980. It extended the philosophies of an earlier Yorkshire Society which, in 1818, wished  to  encourage people born, working or living in the County of Yorkshire to join and then  help improve several aspects of the area, including  the social  welfare of its people as well as Yorkshire's physical environment. Traditionally, the patron of the Yorkshire Society is the Duke of York, and its current Chairman is Sir Rodney Walker.

History
Earlier Societies of the same name included  the organisation which ran the Yorkshire Society's Schools on Westminster Road in London. The Yorkshire  Society referenced in 1818 was headed  by  wealthy  Yorkshire gentry  who  were keen  to provide charity to the working class and poor throughout much of Yorkshire. As is  the case  today,  the  organisation's  patron was the Duke of York.

Goals
To improve the beauty, attraction and amenities in the Yorkshire countryside, towns, villages, historic houses and monuments of all kinds by encouraging and assisting local branches of the Society to prepare, fund and carry through projects in their own areas.
Working with other established organisations in their efforts to generate and promote tourism in the County.
Supporting efforts to study and solve some of the industrial, commercial and unemployment problems in the area.
Drawing together in fellowship Yorkshire folk by mounting regional and local events and providing a forum for discussion and debate.

Charitable works
The Yorkshire Awards, held in Autumn each year, generate substantial funds for many charities.

The Society co-sponsors the annual Yorkshire Awards alongside Yorkshire Television, Joshua Tetley, Asda, Aon, Bain Hogg, Yorkshire Electricity and the Yorkshire Bank.

The Society's award category is the Yorkshire Lifetime Achievement Award. To date recipients have included Lawrence Batley, Ken Morrison, Victor Watson, Lord Harewood, Roy Mason, Baron Mason of Barnsley, Professor Tom Kilburn, Brian Rix, Lord Rix, Michael Parkinson, Barry Cryer, Brian Turner and Ashley Jackson.

Commemorating Yorkshire History
The erecting of Yorkshire Rose plaques to mark the contributions of famous Yorkshire men and women.

To date plaques have commemorated:
Percy Shaw, inventor of cats eyes
Thomas Spencer, joint founder of Marks & Spencer
Henry Moore, Sculptor
Christopher Saxton, Cartographer to Queen Elizabeth I of England
The former Lord St. Oswald, first ever Vice President of the Society
Colonel North, for granting Kirkstall Abbey and grounds to the people
H. H. Asquith, former Prime Minister
Sir Donald Bailey, inventor of the Bailey bridge
Herbert Smith, aircraft designer
Benjamin Latrobe, architect of the United States Capitol, Washington DC
Harold Wilson, Baron Wilson of Rievaulx, former Prime Minister
Benjamin Shaw, textile manufacturer
Sir Martin Frobisher, explorer
Kit Calvert, "saviour of Wensleydale cheese" (turned the Wensleydale Creamery at Hawes into a farmers' cooperative when it was threatened with closure in the 1930s)
Mary Ward, an English Roman Catholic nun who founded the Institute of the Blessed Virgin Mary, also known as the Sisters of Loreto.

Acting as host for the annual Yorkshire History Awards.

Yorkshire Day 
The Yorkshire Society also convenes the civic celebration of Yorkshire Day, which is held on 1 August each year.

References

External links
Page about the Yorkshire Society and Yorkshire Day 2004
Official homepage of the Yorkshire Society (newly updated)

Organisations based in Yorkshire
Yorkshire culture